The following list of W Series drivers lists the 32 drivers who have entered or taken part in a W Series event since the series' inception in 2019.

Lists are accurate up to and including the 2022 W Series Singapore round.

By driver

 – Percentages are of the races contested by said driver.

By country

See also
List of female racing drivers

Notes

References

 
W Series drivers